Straight Outta the Country is the sixth studio album by American country music singer Justin Moore. It was released April 23, 2021 via Big Machine Records' Valory Music Group imprint. The album includes the single "We Didn't Have Much", a number one single on the Billboard Country Airplay charts that year.

Content
Of the album's eight songs, Moore co-wrote two. The project's lead single is "We Didn't Have Much", co-written by the album's producer, Jeremy Stover. Also producing were Paul DiGiovanni and Scott Borchetta.

Critical reception
Michael Rampa of Country Standard Time reviewed the album favorably, saying that Moore "plays the role of country music's champion of the everyman". He also described the songs' melodies and production positively.

Track listing
 "Hearing Things" (Rhett Akins, Kelly Archer, Chris Stevens) - 2:55
 "Consecutive Days Alive" (Casey Beathard, Monty Criswell, Jeremy Stover) - 3:30
 "We Didn’t Have Much" (Paul DiGiovanni, Randy Montana, Stover) - 2:54
 "She Ain’t Mine No More" (Justin Moore, DiGiovanni, Jamie Paulin, Stover) - 3:37
 "More Than Me" (Moore, DiGiovanni, Chase McGill, Stover) - 2:53
 "Straight Outta the Country" (Hardy, Cam Montgomery, Josh Thompson) - 2:48
 "You Keep Getting Me Drunk" (Akins, Archer, DiGiovanni) - 3:01
 "We Didn’t Have Much (Acoustic Version)" (DiGiovanni, Montana, Stover) - 3:01

Personnel
Adapted from liner notes.

Sarah Buxton - background vocals
Roger Coleman - acoustic guitar, background vocals
Josh Cross - acoustic guitar, background vocals
Paul DiGiovanni - acoustic guitar, electric guitar, keyboards, programming, background vocals
Paul Franklin - steel guitar
Evan Hutchings - drums
Mike Johnson - steel guitar
Brent Mason - electric guitar
Justin Moore - lead vocals
Jason Kyle Saetveit - background vocals
Jimmie Lee Sloas - bass guitar
Chris Stevens - keyboards, programming
Ilya Toshinsky - acoustic guitar
Derek Wells - electric guitar

Chart performance

Weekly charts

References

2021 albums
Big Machine Records albums
Justin Moore albums
Albums produced by Jeremy Stover